were rebellious or autonomous groups of people that were formed in several regions of Japan in the 15th-16th centuries; backed up by the power of the Jōdo Shinshū sect of Buddhism, they opposed the rule of governors or daimyō. Mainly consisting of priests, peasants, merchants and local lords who followed the sect, they sometimes associated with non-followers of the sect. They were at first organized to only a small degree; if any single person could be said to have had any influence over them it was Rennyo, the leader of the Jōdo Shinshū Hongan-ji sect at that time.  Whilst he may have used the religious fervour of the Ikkō-ikki in the defence of his temple settlements, he was also careful to distance himself from the wider social rebellion of the Ikkō movement as a whole, and from offensive violence in particular.

With recent improvements in firearms at the time, the Ikko-ikki movement would be able to rise very suddenly as a menacing force and which presented a credible threat to the government, as a peasant or merchant could transform himself into a capable mobile cannoner in mere days.

History
According to Sansom, "The Ikko (Single-Minded) sect of Nenbutsu, or Buddha-calling ... is a branch of the worship of Amida developed from the teaching of Shinran into an aggressive doctrine of salvation by faith."  In the 13th century, the jizamurai, a new class of small landowners, "formed leagues (ikki) for mutual defence", since they came from "good warrior families, long established in their own districts, and they were determined to protect their interests, both economic and social, against newcomers", according to Sansom. The Shirahata-Ikki, "White Flag Uprising", and Mikazuki-Ikki, "Crescent Uprising", were examples of the numerous risings against the Ashikaga shogunate.  An uprising involving an entire province was called a Kuni-Ikki (kuni meaning province).  Uprisings took place in 1351, 1353, 1369, 1377, 1384–1386, and 1366–1369. The risings in the 15th century, Tsuchi-Ikki or Do-Ikki, were better organized "and the peasants appear to have played a more prominent part".  At the conclusion of the Ōnin War, in 1477, "many of the members of the numerous ikki" occupied the monasteries and shrines, and "would ring the warning bells day and night, hoping to terrify the rich citizens", according to Sansom.

The Ikkō-ikki were, at first, disparate and disorganized followers of Rennyo's teachings. His missionary work, and his appointment to the position of abbot of the Kyoto Hongan-ji, was in 1457, allowed him to "express in words and deeds" his unorthodox views. In 1465, Rennyo was forced to flee Kyoto, and established a new Hongan-ji branch temple, Yoshizaki-gobō, in Echizen Province in 1471. It was at this temple that he began to attract a significant following among peasants and farmers. About 1486 brought the first violent uprising, the first major organized action on the part of the Ikkō-ikki. They overthrew the governor of Kaga Province, and took control of it for themselves; this represented the first time in Japanese history that a group of commoners ruled a province.

They fought Asakura Norikage again in the 1555 Battle of Daishoji-omote.

Rennyo was a pacifist and taught pacifism. He advocated self-defense only as a guard against the particularly tumultuous times in which he lived. Daimyō, samurai warlords, fought one another for territory nearly constantly, across the entire country. Rennyo thus saw to it that the temples of his sect were fortified and defended from attackers. Though it was his charismatic leadership and populist teachings that inspired the fervor which powered the Ikkō-ikki uprisings, he never advocated or supported them. The uprisings continued nevertheless, past Rennyo's death in 1499, and the sub-sect of Jōdo Shinshū that he had founded spread as well. They established themselves in fortresses at Ishiyama Hongan-ji, just outside Osaka, and in Nagashima, on the borders of Owari and Ise Provinces and in a series of temples in Mikawa Province as well.

Towards the end of the 16th century, however, their growing numbers and strength caught the attention and concern of the great samurai leaders of the time. Tokugawa Ieyasu worried that sōhei of Mikawa Province would rise up and seize the province. In 1564, his forces, with the help of Jōdo-shū sōhei, defeated the Mikawa Ikkō-ikki in the Battle of Azukizaka.

The ikki attracted the ire of the likes of Tokugawa Ieyasu and Oda Nobunaga due to the economic and political threat they posed, more so than as a result of their military might. Ishiyama Hongan-ji and other strongholds of the ikki lay across major trade routes and occupied the same areas that Nobunaga saw as his primary territorial objectives. Nearly every road to the capital from this western part of the country was controlled by the ikki or their allies, and the populist roots of the ikki movement gave them significant economic power as well. Nobunaga in particular sought the destruction of the Ikkō-ikki for these reasons, and because they allied themselves with nearly every one of his major enemies or rivals. Ashikaga Yoshiaki was once strongly supported in his claim to become Shōgun by Nobunaga, but turned to the ikki when their relationship soured. The ikki also had powerful allies in the Mōri, Azai, and Asakura clans.  In the Asakura stronghold of Echizen province, today's Fukui-prefecture, Nobunaga ordered his generals to kill the people in Ajimano village in August 1575 as noted in The Chronicle of Lord Nobunaga. The Ishiyama Hongan-ji and Nagashima fortresses were besieged several times by the forces of Oda Nobunaga. After several failed attempts at seizing each emplacement, he eventually succeeded.

In the 1580s, the last of the Ikkō-ikki courted Toyotomi Hideyoshi, and fought alongside his forces against warrior monks and priests of other sects.

Weapons, training, and lifestyle
The Ikkō-ikki bands of the 16th century, due largely to their origins as countryside mobs, used quite varied armor and armament. Many wore the more traditional priest robes, with varying degrees and types of armor. Some wore various sorts of helmets, while others opted for the straw hat and cloak of a peasant. Naginata remained very common, along with a variety of swords and daggers, and a limited number of arquebuses. Finally, while not truly armor nor armament, a very common item wielded by the mobs of Ikkō-ikki priest warriors was a banner with a Buddhist slogan written upon it. Some of the more common slogans included the nenbutsu chant "Hail to Buddha Amida!" (Namu Amida Butsu; 南無阿弥陀仏) and "He who advances is sure of salvation, but he who retreats will go to hell".

Shin Buddhism was persecuted in response to the Ikkō-ikki, which caused the formation of kakure nenbutsu secret societies.

References

Further reading
 Dobbins, James C. (1989). Jodo Shinshu: Shin Buddhism in Medieval Japan. Bloomington, Indiana: Indiana University Press. ; OCLC 470742039
 Neil McMullin (1984). Buddhism and the State in Sixteenth-Century Japan, Princeton University Press.
 Repp, Martin (2011). Review of War and Faith: Ikko Ikki in Late Muromachi Japan by Carol Richmond Tsang (2007) in Japanese Religions 36: 1-2, pp. 104–108 [scroll down the page]
 Gyūichi Ōta (2011 translation; 1610 account). The Chronicle of Lord Nobunaga. Volume 36 of Brill's Japanese Studies Library, Jurgis Saulius Algirdas Elisonas & Jeroen Pieter Lamers, editors. Leiden, The Netherlands: Brill.  [https://www.worldcat.org/oclc/743693801 E- 
 Otani, Chojun (1968). « Le mouvement insurrectionnel des Ikko-Ikki, adeptes de la secte Bouddhique Shin-Shu au XVème et au XVIème siècle, École pratique des hautes études. 4e section, Sciences historiques et philologiques, Annuaire 1967-1968,  pp. 609–612 
 Sugiyama, Shigeki J. (1994). "Honganji in the Muromachi-Sengoku Period: Taking Up the Sword and its Consequences", The Pacific World, New Series, pp. 10, 56–74

 
Buddhism in the Azuchi–Momoyama period
Buddhism in the Muromachi period
Former countries in Japanese history
History of Buddhism in Japan
 
Japanese rebels
Japanese warriors
16th-century rebels